Yunus (Turkish: Yunus), also spelled Younas, Younes, Younis, Younus, Yunes, Younous and Yonas, is a common male given name, the Arabic version of Greek Ιωνάς (Ionas), from Hebrew יוֹנָה Jonah 'dove'.

People with the given name

Younas
 Younas Ahmadzai (born 1995), Afghan cricketer

Younes
 Younes Ahamdi (born 1976), Moroccan judoka
 Younes Al Shibani (born 1981), Libyan football defender
 Younes Ali (born 1983), Qatari footballer
 Younes Belhanda (born 1990), French-Moroccan footballer
 Younes El Aynaoui (born 1971), Moroccan tennis player
 Younes Kaboul (born 1986), French footballer
 Younes Khattabi, Moroccan rugby league player
 Younes Nazarian, Iranian-born American business mogul and philanthropist
 Younes Shokrkhah (born 1957), Iranian journalist
 Younes Tsouli, Moroccan Islamist

Younis
 Mohammed Younis al-Ahmed al-Muwali, Iraqi former Baath Party member
 Younis Ahmed, Pakistani cricketer
 Younis Khan, Pakistani cricketer
 Younis Mahmoud, Iraqi footballer
 Younis Mohammad Ibrahim al-Hayyari, Moroccan terrorism suspect

Younus
 Younus Shaikh, Pakistani dissident

Yunus
 Mohammad Yunus Saleem, Indian politician
 Yunus Altun, Turkish footballer
 Yunus Badat, Zambian cricketer
 Yunus Emre, Turkish poet and mystic
 Yunus Erçelik (born 1980), Turkish motorcycle racer
 Yunus İçuz, Turkish footballer
 Yunus Khan, 15th-century Mughal Khan
 Yunus Mallı, German-Turkish footballer
 Yunus Nadi Abalıoğlu, Turkish journalist
 Yunus Parvez, Indian actor
 Yunus Paşa, Ottoman statesman
 Yunus Qanuni, Afghan politician
 Yunus Yosfiah, Indonesian army officer

See also 
 Yunus (surname)

Arabic masculine given names
Turkish masculine given names